Er with tick (Ҏ ҏ; italics: Ҏ ҏ) is a letter of the Cyrillic script.  Its form is derived from the Cyrillic letter Er (Р р) by adding a tick to the bowl of the letter.

Er with tick is used in the alphabet of the Kildin Sami language, where it  represents the voiceless alveolar trill .

Computing codes

See also
Р̌ р̌ : Cyrillic letter Er with caron
Ԗ ԗ : Cyrillic letter Rha
Cyrillic characters in Unicode

References